Galla may refer to:

Given name
 Galla (wife of Julius Constantius), member of the Constantinian dynasty
 Galla (wife of Theodosius I) (370s–394), empress of the Roman Empire 
 Galla (wife of Eucherius) (c.380-420s)
 Galla Placidia (392–450), daughter of Theodosius I
 Galla of Rome (died 550), 6th-century saint

Indian surname
 Aruna Kumari Galla (born 1949), minister of Andhra Pradesh Government
 Ramachandra Naidu Galla (born 1938), founder of Amaraja Group
 Galla Jayadev (born 1966), an Indian-American politician and industrialist in India

Other uses
 Ryszard Galla, Polish politician
 Galla Gaulo, the fifth traditional Doge of Venice (755–756)
 Galla tinctoria, the commercial nutgall produced by the gall oak (Quercus lusitanica)
 Galla Township, Pope County, Arkansas
 Gallu, a Mesopotamian demon
 Another name for P'tcha, a traditional Ashkenazi Jewish food
 A historically offensive name for the Oromo ethnic group in Ethiopia
 Oromo, the language of this people
 Gallaland, the lands occupied by this people in southern Ethiopia, particularly in a historical context

Indian surnames